These are a list of matches played by Mauritius from 1980 to 1989.

Key

Matches

1980

1981

1982

1983

1984

1985

1986

1987

1988

1989

References

1980s in Mauritius
Mauritius national football team results